Notable poets from Ghana include:

A
Kobena Eyi Acquah (b. 1952)
Apiorkor Seyiram Ashong-Abbey (b. 1988)
P. A. K. Aboagye (1925–2001)
Geormbeeyi Adali-Mortty (b. 1916)
Padmore Enyonam Agbemabiese (b. 1965)
Ama Ata Aidoo (b. 1942)
Kofi Anyidoho (b. 1947)
Raphael Armattoe (1913–1953)
Kofi Awoonor (1935–2013)

B
J. Benibengor Blay (b. 1915)
Kwesi Brew (1928–2007)
Nana Brew-Hammond
Abena Busia (b. 1953)
Akosua Busia (b. 1966)

C
 Gladys Casely-Hayford (1901–1950)
 Chief Moomen

D
Nana Awere Damoah (b. 1975)
Lawrence Darmani (b. 1956)
Kwame Dawes (b. 1962)
Joe de Graft (1924–1978)
Michael Dei-Anang (1909–1977)
Amu Djoleto (b. 1929)
Cameron Duodu (b. 1937)

K 
Ellis Ayitey Komey (1927–1972)
Koo Kumi (b. 1994)
Benjamin Kwakye (b. 1967)

L
Kojo Laing (1946–2017)

O
Atukwei Okai (1941–2018)

P
Frank Kobina Parkes (1923–2004)
Nii Parkes (b. 1974)

S
Efua Sutherland (1924–1996)

References

Ghana
Poets